"A Bad Dream" is a song by English rock band Keane appearing as the fifth track on their second album, Under the Iron Sea. It was released on 22 January 2007 as the fifth and final single from the album. The song peaked at No. 23 in the UK Singles Chart, becoming the band's first single to miss the top 20.

Track listings

CD single
Catalogue number: 1723057
 "A Bad Dream"
 "She Sells Sanctuary"
 "A Bad Dream" (Luna-C Hardcore Remix)
 "A Bad Dream" live in Berlin (video)

UK 7-inch vinyl
Catalogue: 1723058
 "A Bad Dream"
 "She Sells Sanctuary"

256 MB USB memory stick content
 "A Bad Dream"
 "A Bad Dream" (video)
 "Enjoy the Silence" (Depeche Mode cover)
 "A Bad Dream" (Luna-C Bangin' Remix)
 Competition to see the band at Wembley

Background
It was partially based on the "An Irish Airman Foresees His Death" poem by W.B. Yeats. Rice-Oxley explained on a podcast:

Composition and recording
It was composed by Tim Rice-Oxley and Tom Chaplin. It was recorded at the Heliocentric Studios, Rye, East Sussex and at The Magic Shop, New York.

Music video
The music video for "A Bad Dream" was shot on 22 November 2006 and premiered a month later. Singer Tom Chaplin appears inside a totally black room. Then a white stripe of light can be seen getting bigger and bigger until the room becomes completely white. Later on, a black stripe can be seen again getting bigger and bigger until the whole room is black again.

An alternate version released on Yahoo Launch UK features short clips of Tim Rice-Oxley and Richard Hughes intercut into the original, looking at Chaplin with melancholic faces.

Chart performance

References

External links
Keaneshaped – Information about record

Keane (band) songs
2007 singles
Songs written by Tim Rice-Oxley
Songs written by Tom Chaplin
Songs written by Richard Hughes (musician)
Songs based on poems
2005 songs
Island Records singles